Gawler is a locality and small rural community in the local government area of Central Coast, in the North West region of Tasmania. The 2016 census determined a population of 622 for the state suburb of Gawler.

History
The Gawler River, which flows through the locality to the Leven River, was named for Governor Gawler of South Australia in 1844. It is likely that the locality was named for the river.

Road infrastructure
The B17 route (Gawler Road) runs from the Bass Highway through the locality, from where it provides access to many other localities before returning to the Bass Highway further west at Penguin.

References

Localities of Central Coast Council (Tasmania)
Towns in Tasmania